The winds of Provence, the region of southeast France along the Mediterranean from the Alps to the mouth of the Rhone River, are an important feature of Provençal life, and each one has a traditional local name, in the Provençal language.

The most famous Provençal winds are:

 the Levant, a very humid east wind, which brings moisture from the eastern Mediterranean.
 the Tramontane, a strong, cold and dry north wind, similar to the Mistral, which blows from the Massif Central mountains toward the Mediterranean to the west of the Rhone.
 the Marin, a strong, wet and cloudy south wind, which blows in from the Gulf of Lion.
 the Sirocco, a southeast wind coming from the Sahara desert in Africa, can reach hurricane force, and brings either reddish dust or heavy rains.

The Provençal names for the winds are very similar to the names in the closely related Catalan language:

 Tramontana (Pr.) = Tramuntana (Catalan)
 Levant (Pr.) = Llevant (Catalan)
 Mistral (Pr.) = Mestral (Catalan)

Winds in Provençal culture 

  The winds of Provence, particularly the Mistral, have long had an influence on the architecture of Provence.  The mas traditionally faces southeast, with its back to the Mistral, and many Provençal churches have open iron grill bell towers, which allow the Mistral wind to pass through.
  The traditional Provençal Christmas creche often features one santon, or Provençal character, holding his  hat and wearing a cape billowing from the Mistral.
  The Mistral also features in Provençal literature, and in the more recent novels of Marcel Pagnol.

Names of the Winds of Provence (by points of the compass) 

Traditional compass roses in Provence (see illustration, which shows Midi, or the South, at the top)  have  the names of the winds by the points of the compass.

 Tramontane (North wind)
 Vent droit
 Montagnére
 Brise Noire
 Gregale (Northeast wind)
 Lombarde
Levant-Grégale
 Auro-Bruno
 Levant (East wind)
 Auro-rosso
 Vent blanc
 Leveche
 Autan (Southeast wind)
 Sirocco
 Simoun
 Embat
 Marin (South wind)
 Vent de bas
 Chili
 Vent du Large
 Labech  (Southwest wind)
 Libeccio
 Garbi
 Cierco
 Ponent (West wind)
 Traverse
 Maestro
 Galerne
 Mistral (Northwest wind)
 Traverse-haute
 Brise
 Auro-Drecho

References

Bibliography 
Jean Vialar, Les vents régionaux et locaux, 1948, réédité par Météo-France en 2003

External links
Local Mediterranean winds
Name of Winds
Tramuntane at ggweather.com
Wind rose at the Catalan Government web site 

Winds
Provence